SMP Negeri (SMPN) 3 Balikpapan is one of the public Junior High schools in East Borneo, Indonesia. Motto of this school is: “Tiada Hari Tanpa Prestasi”.

Facilities 
Some facilities that SMPN 3 provides to support teaching and learning activities:
 Library
 Biology Lab
 Physics Lab
 Computer Lab
 Language Lab
 Multimedia Room
 Recycle / 3R Room
 Administration Office
 Mosque
 Cooperative
 OSIS Room
 Counseling Room
 Meeting Hall
 Studen Health Unit's Room
 Music Room
 Canteen
 Four Fields (Basketball, Volleyball, Tennis and Ceremony) History

History 
SMPN 3 Balikpapan has operated since 1962. A leader on that year was Mr. ML Maliangkay. The, on 1966, SMPN 3 has moved out to Kebun Sayur. ML Maliangkay officiated until 1972. On 1972–1988, SMPN 3 was being led by Djumberi. He moved the school to Gn. Samarinda because there was a big fire accident on Kebun Sayur. That accident destroyed most of SMPN 3 buildings. On 1988–1996, SMPN 3's principal was Ganda Sudarman. Next, on 1996, he was being replaced by M. Amir, who was a principal for this school until 2003.

List of principals:
 ML Maliangkay
 Djumberi
 Ganda Sudarman
 M. Amir
 Dra. Tatiek Sulastri
 Dra. Hj. Ida Afrida M. M.Pd 
 Supriyani, M.Pd.
 Drs. Purwoto, MM
 Cheiriyah Idha, S.Pd
 Hj. Eny Wahyuni, M.Pd.

References 

Schools in Indonesia